The Oulad Tidrarin is a Sahrawi tribe of Arab origins, formerly considered to be of Ansar status. They speak Hassaniya Arabic. They are Muslims, belonging to the Maliki school of Sunni Islam. They live mainly in Western Sahara but also in Morocco and Mauritania.

Origins
The Oulad Tidrarin is one of the oldest Arab tribes that settled the Saguia el-Hamra and Río de Oro areas of Northwest Africa, their original home. Many live in the Cape Bojador and the coastline of the south of Morocco, some on the coast of Saguia el-Hamra and some branches live in the south and east of Mauritania. There are some members of the Uladsliman and Lidadsa in subgroups in Mali.

The name Tidrarin is Berber and means 'small mountains'.

Religious activism
The tribe has established centres for the spread of Islamic culture, particularly along the Atlantic coast region. They have received recognition from the Moroccan sultans for their work in this area.

Clan subdivisions
Oulad Tidrarin can be divided into eleven clans and twenty-three subclans. The clans are:

1. Laboubate 
They consist of five subclans:
msilia
 Ahl Hajj
 Asnubat
 Lamnabha
 Ahl Ahmed Msska
 Sawalih

2. Oulad Sidiasin Ben Aalilaassam 
They consist of three subclans:
 Oulad Sliman
 Da'anin
 Ahl Abrehmat

3. Lidadssa (Alidadsa) 
4. Alabobat (Laaboubat) 
5. Oulad Sidahmad Boghanbur (Oulad Boughanbour) 
 This clan consists of six subclans:
 Lafaaris
 Oulad Yassin
 Oulad Abdallah (Oulad Moussa, Oulad Boucheguer)
 Oulad Ismail
 Oulad Abderrahman (Ahlsteilah and Arhailat)
 Ahl Talbaali
6. Al Husinat (Lahssinat) 
7. Oulad Ali (Al Alaouiin the brave clan in the tribe) 
8. Lahmaidat
9. Ahl Yara 
10. Oulad Bousshab 
11. Oulad El Ghazi

All of these tribes gathered in Uladtidrrarin flying are attributed to the Ansar; furthermore, they belong to the main tribe of Azd which contains many tribes, likewise tribe of chuhuh in UAE

The majority adheres to certified documents to prove their Ansar parentage. Some of the documents are stored in patches of skin and some in patches of old paper.

Most clans meet in the "Aalilasam." A Whole, and who was also Sidaali.

It Ali ben Abiazi bin Ibrahim bin Hannin bin Sarhan. And his sons:
Aaz nicknamed Merbaialitami, Grandfather of Oulad Boughanbur and the Oulad Ali,
Aoub, Grandfather of Alabobat,
Ahmed Ben Yaddas, Grandfather Alidadssa
Moughlich, Grandfather of Lamghalcha,
Sidi Yassin, Grandfather of Oulad Sliman, Ahl Braihmat and Da'anin,
Sidi Al Ghazi, Grandfather of Oulad Al Ghazi,

See also
 Beni Hassan
 Maliq
 Banu Hilal
 Oulad Delim
 Reguibat

References

Arab tribes in Morocco
Ethnic groups in Western Sahara